For lists of Wales national football team results see:

 Wales national football team results 1876–99
 Wales national football team results 1900–14
 Wales national football team results 1920–39
 Wales national football team results 1946–59
 Wales national football team results 1960–79
 Wales national football team results 1980–99
 Wales national football team results 2000–19
 Wales national football team results 2020–39
 Wales national football team results (unofficial matches)

External links
Fixture on the Football Association of Wales website
Results on the Football Association of Wales website